Kang Mal-geum (born 3 January 1979) is a South Korean actress. She graduated in Arts from Pusan National University, Department of Korean Language and Literature. She made her acting debut in 2010 in the film Yong-Tae :The Ordinary Memories. She is known for her role in the film Lucky Chan-sil (2019), for which she earned six 'Best New Actress' and one 'Best Actress' awards in seven different award shows. She also appeared in the film  The Chase (2017) and the television series Legal High (2019) and Missing: The Other Side (2020). In 2021, she appeared in a small role on the hit Netflix survival drama series Squid Game.

Filmography

Film

Television series

Web series

Theatre

 Lonely Man
 Hard Man
 Sad Man
 Red Peters-K's Recital
 Troy's Women
 Dandelion Wind
 Game
 Orestia
 Kyung-sook Kyung-sook's Father
 Ro Pung Chan's Nomadic Theater
 Hermes
 Penn

Ambassadorship

Awards and nominations

References

External links
 
 
 Kang Mal-geum on Daum 
 

21st-century South Korean actresses
South Korean film actresses
South Korean television actresses
Living people
1979 births
Pusan National University alumni
Actresses from Busan
Best New Actress Paeksang Arts Award (film) winners